Interstate 240 (I-240) is a  Interstate Highway loop in the US state of North Carolina. It serves as an urban connector for Asheville and runs in a semicircle around the north of the city's downtown district between exits 53B and 46B of I-40. Between those points, I-40 continues in an east–west direction further south of the city, roughly parallel to the Swannanoa and French Broad rivers. The western segment of I-240 is now being cosigned with I-26 as part of a larger project extending I-26 from its former western terminus at I-40/I-240 to U.S. Highway 23 (US 23) near Kingsport, Tennessee.

A planned construction project, dubbed the I-26 Connector, is a $600–800-million project to build the missing gap of I-26 through Asheville. Broken into three sections, they are all planned and funded in the 2016–2025 STIP. Section A, between Haywood Road and Brevard Road, will be a widening project with reconfiguration of ramps at Haywood, Amboy and Brevard. Section B, between north of Haywood Road to US 19/US 23/US 70, is the most expensive section of the project at $332 million.  After a review of various alternative designs, both state and federal agencies chose Alternative 4B, which will convert Patton Avenue along Bowen Bridges to local traffic and reroute I-240 along I-26 further north. Section C, the I-26/I-240/I-40 interchange, will be reconfigured to include missing ramp connects and a widening of I-40 through the area. The approximately  project will begin right-of-way acquisition in 2019, with construction on all three sections in 2021. Additional plans for I-240 in west Asheville call for its expansion from four lanes to eight lanes.

Years prior to the loop's completion, I-240 was known as I-140; however, no signage was ever posted for I-140. The I-140 designation has now been given to a spur route in Wilmington.

Route description
I-240 begins at an interchange with I-26 and I-40 west of Asheville. I-240 and I-26 travel concurrently for  along the western section of the routing. I-240 travels almost parallel to the French Broad River to its east. In the northwestern part of the route, US 19, US 23, and U.S. Highway 74 Alternate (US 74A) merge onto I-240 to cross the French Broad River. After crossing the river, I-26 proper ends and becomes Future I-26. Future I-26/US 19/US 23 exit off to the north and US 70 merges with I-240. The concurrent highways travel through the northern section of downtown Asheville. US 70/US 74A exits off I-240 at Charlotte Street. The Interstate continues through a cut in the mountain before turning back to the south. I-240 cross the Swannanoa River near Asheville Mall before terminating at an interchange with I-40 while the roadway continues on as US 74A, known locally as Charlotte Highway.

History
In the early 1960s, the east–west freeway around downtown Asheville, designated US 19/US 23, opened from the Beaucatcher Tunnel westward to NC 191.

By 1966, Hanover Street had been converted to a freeway, which carried U.S. Highway 19 Business (US 19 Bus.)/US 23 Bus./NC 191; additional freeway was constructed from Haywood Street to I-40. In 1968, eastbound lanes were added to the Smoky Park Bridge, the main connector across the French Broad River. The original lanes, opened January 23, 1952, became westbound lanes.

The next step began with the 1964 presentation by J. O. "Buck" Buchanan to the NC Highway Commission Board. An Interstate Highway was to be built from the east to downtown Asheville to connect with the existing freeway. The best way to do this, it was concluded, was to blast an  passage through Beaucatcher Mountain. The Beaucatcher Mountain Defense Association, formed in the early 1970s, endorsed a tunnel, which would mean only about five percent of the mountain would be disturbed. In 1977, the North Carolina Department of Transportation (NCDOT) selected Asheville Contracting Co. for the project.  of rock, including greywacke believed to be one billion years old, would have to be moved, and all of it could be used in the construction. The company had several connections to those responsible for the road plan: company president Baxter Taylor was a business partner of Ted Jordan, a highway board member and a member of the Chamber of Commerce Highway Committee; they founded Hyde Insurance Company, which sold $39.9 million (equivalent to $ in ) in bonds to finance the plan. And Buchanan went on to work in public relations for Asheville Contracting. One of the Defense Association's arguments was the highway's proximity to Zealandia, the estate of Philip Henry, whose Tudor mansion was covered by the 1966 National Historic Preservation Act. However, when the mansion was named to the National Register of Historic Places on March 14, 1977, the destruction of the mountain had started. The  project was completed October 31, 1980.

In 1971, NC 191 was extended along part of the unsigned freeway from Haywood Street to Brevard Road. On November 1, 1980, I-240 was officially established on the western half of the freeway from I-40 to Charlotte Street; NC 191 was rerouted north along Brevard Road to its current terminus at Haywood Street. By 1982, I-240 was extended through the Beaucatcher Cut onto new freeway east to I-40. In 1995, all of I-240 was named the Billy Graham Freeway.

In 1989, the North Carolina General Assembly approved a plan for urban loops around the state's major cities. Included in this plan was a bypass for Asheville, which included an "I-26 Connector" to link two sections of I-26, one ending south of Asheville, and the other north of the city designated "Future 26". For the controversial plan, $14.2 million (equivalent to $ in ) was spent, but, in 2010, the I-26 Connector was demoted to last among 21 urban loop projects. Improvements to I-240 were scheduled for 2020.

On April 5, 2012, the North Carolina Board of Transportation voted unanimously to rename the Smoky Park Bridge for Capt. Jeffrey Bowen, an Asheville firefighter who died in July 2011 fighting a fire. The board's policy traditionally prohibited naming state roads and bridges for firefighters, but numerous protests of the state's March decision led to the change. North Carolina Department of Transportation statistics show the eight-lane bridge to be the most traveled section of highway in Western North Carolina, with 99,000 vehicles a day.

As part of the I-26 Connector, in 2016, both state and federal agencies chose Alternative 4B, which will convert Patton Avenue along Bowen Bridge to local traffic and reroute I-240 along I-26 further north. In addition, the I-26/I-240/I-40 interchange, will be reconfigured to include missing ramp connects and a widening of I-40 through the area. The approximately  project planned to begin right-of-way acquisition in 2019, though delays included state money and worries over how neighborhoods would be affected. Contracts are to be awarded in 2023 and 2024 and construction to take three to five years. The estimated cost increased from $750 million in 2017 to $1.2 billion in 2023.

Exit list

See also
 
 Asheville metropolitan area

References

External links

 

40-2 North Carolina
40-2
Interstate 40-2
240 North Carolina
Transportation in Buncombe County, North Carolina